Antoine Schnapper (10 July 1933 – 29 August 2004) was a French art historian on art of the 17th and the 18th century. A student of André Chastel, he organised many retrospectives on artists of that period, notably one at the Louvre in 1989 on Jacques-Louis David to commemorate the bicentenary of the French Revolution. He taught at the Paris-Sorbonne University.

Selected works
 Jean Jouvenet (1644-1717) et la peinture d'histoire à Paris, nouvelle édition complétée par Christine Gouzi, Arthena, 2010 (ISBN 978-2-903239-42-8).
 Le métier de peintre au grand siècle ; Paris : Gallimard, 2004. 
 Collections et collectionneurs dans la France du XVIIe siècle ; Paris : Flammarion, 1988. 
 David témoin de son temps, Office du Livre, Fribourg, 1980  Reference
 Tableaux pour le Trianon de marbre 1688-1714. ; Paris, La Haye, Mouton, 1967. 
 Jean Jouvenet, 1644-1717. ; Rouen. Musée des beaux arts, 1966.

Bibliography
Necrologies - Antoine Schnapper (1933-2004) ; Pierre Rosenberg ; Revue de l'art. no. 146, (2004): 101.

References 

1933 births
2004 deaths
French art historians
Academic staff of the University of Paris
French male non-fiction writers
French people of German descent
20th-century French male writers